During the 2009–10 season, Queens Park Rangers played in the Football League Championship, their sixth season of their spell at this level.

Season review

New managerial team
Jim Magilton was announced as the replacement for Paulo Sousa as manager on 3 June 2009. John Gorman was named Magilton's assistant on 17 June, reprising his former role with Magilton at Ipswich Town.

Friendlies
Queens Park Rangers played their first pre-season friendly against Aldershot Town at The Recreation Ground. Rangers won the game 4–0 with goals from Ákos Buzsáky, Heiðar Helguson, Patrick Agyemang and Dexter Blackstock. Former Sunderland striker David Connolly featured in the game for the R's. The players then headed out to Slovenia for a game against NK Celje. The game ended 2–2, Angelo Balanta getting both goals for Rangers. They then went on to Croatia to play a game at NK Karlovac. The game ended 3–1 to the Croats, the R's goal coming through Rowan Vine. After returning to England Rangers beat Forest Green Rovers 2–0, with goals from Damion Stewart and Alessandro Pellicori, they then played Oxford United at The Kassam Stadium. The game ended 2–2 with goals from Gavin Mahon and Wayne Routledge.

After beating Wycombe Wanderers 2–1, with goals from Gavin Mahon and Patrick Agyemang, Rangers sent a team to Kettering Town and won the game 2–0 with goals coming from Heiðar Helguson and Alessandro Pellicori. In their last pre-season game, the R's beat Southampton 3–0 thanks to Kaspars Gorkss, Angelo Balanta and Adel Taarabt.

Season
QPR begun their season as hosts to Blackpool. The game ended 1–1, with defender Peter Ramage scoring on the 88th minute. Their streak continued with another 1–1 draw to Plymouth Argyle, with both QPR players on the scoreline. Helguson scored on the 43rd minute, with Gorkss making the game level deep into stoppage time.

The first loss of the season was away to Bristol, with Maynard scoring to break QPR's unbeaten streak. Next was a tricky home game to Nottingham Forest. The game ended 1–1, with Mikele Leigertwood scoring for the Hoops. They then went on to win the next game to Scunthorpe, with new loan signing Adel Taarabt scoring the winner in the 4th minute. QPR continued their streak with a draw to Peterborough, and beating promotion contenders Cardiff City 2–0. Their confidence shot in the next game against Barnsley, with 5 goals scored, including a brace from Buzsáky.

Players
As of the end of the season.

First team squad

Transfers

In

Out

Loaned in

Loaned out

League table

Results
QPR scores given first

Football League Championship

FA Cup

League Cup

Statistics

Goalscorers

a 1 own-goal was also scored for QPR

Appearances

1 Player left the club before the end of the season.
2 Player was out on loan for all or part of the season.
3 Player was on loan from another club for all or part of the season.

Clean sheets

References

Notes

Queens Park Rangers F.C. seasons
Queens Park Rangers